Sean Paul Bush is an American emergency physician, academic, and researcher.  An expert on venomous bites and stings, he was a host of the Animal Planet series, Venom ER. He is the current President of the North American Society of Toxinology.

Career
Bush was on the faculty at Loma Linda University School of Medicine in Loma Linda, California. He has received two Research Training Awards (1999, 2005) from the Wilderness Medical Society, and a Hultgren Award (2001). He has appeared in  television series including Venom ER, aired by the BBC and Animal Planet. He is the current President of the North American Society of Toxinology.

According to Scopus, he has an h-index of 19.

Television 

 Venom ER, (10-episode series), BBC, programme 1
 Untold Stories of the E.R. - "Too Close to Home" (AKA Snakebite Son), The Learning Channel
 I Was Bitten, Discovery Channel and Animal Planet
 Dr. Bite (AKA Miracle Man), Animal Planet
 Snake Underworld, National Geographic Wild Channel, 2011
 Venom: Nature's Killer, PBS-NOVA 2011
 Nightmares of Nature BBC, 2012
 The Snake Doctor, for UNC-TV:Life Changing television - Science, 201

References 

Living people
American emergency physicians
American television hosts
Texas A&M University alumni
Loma Linda University faculty
East Carolina University faculty
Year of birth missing (living people)